Muthalakodam is a suburb located  east of Thodupuzha Town, in Idukki district in the Indian state of Kerala.

St George Forane Church
The church at Muthalakodam, near Thodupuzha, is believed to have constructed before 13th Century. It is believed to have been set up in the 19th century by an ancient noble lady named (Mattathil Muthi). It was re-built several times since then. Today's magnificent church was built in the year 1973. The feast of Muthalakodath Muthappan is celebrated on 21–24 April, the main feast days being 23rd & 24th. The incessant flow of worshippers starts by sunrise every day and continues unabated till 8 o'clock when the church closes.

Holy Family Hospital
Holy Family hospital is one of the best hospitals available in Idukki District. This Hospital was founded on 1971 and is managed by Sacred Heart Sisters, Jyothi Province, Kothamangalam. It is an ISO 9001:2008 certified institution, with 24 hours emergency and trauma care service, blood bank, interventional cardiology, general and neuro surgery, orthopedics, obstetrics and has 400  beds. This non-profit multi speciality hospital caters the medical needs of people from all over idukki district. This hospital offers MSc Nursing, B.Sc Nursing and General nursing courses.

St George Higher Secondary School 
This school is a minority institution owned by the corporate educational agency, Diocese of  Kothamangalam and locally run by St George Forane Church. The High school started in 1976 and the Higher Secondary wing in 1998. The Higher Secondary section has an intake of 350 students per year and is the leading +2 school in Idukki district.

External links 

 Kerala's own Portel
 Thodupuzha

Cities and towns in Idukki district